The 2022 CAF Super Cup, known the TotalEnergies CAF Super Cup 2022 for sponsorship reasons, was the 31st CAF Super Cup, an annual football match in Africa organized by the Confederation of African Football (CAF), between the winners of the previous season's two CAF club competitions, the CAF Champions League and the CAF Confederation Cup.

The match was played between Wydad AC from Morocco, the 2021–22 CAF Champions League winners, and RS Berkane from Morocco, the 2021–22 CAF Confederation Cup winners.

This is the first-ever all-Moroccan CAF Super Cup, and the fourth that contested teams from the same country, after 1994, 1997 and 2008 editions.

RS Berkane won first title CAF Super Cup after defeated Wydad AC 2-0

Teams

Venue

The match was played in Prince Moulay Abdellah Stadium in Rabat, Morocco.

It was one of the three venues that hosted the 2022 Women's Africa Cup of Nations.

Format
The CAF Super Cup is played as a single match at a neutral venue, with the CAF Champions League winners designated as the "home" team for administrative purposes. If the score is tied at the end of regulation, extra time will not be played, and the penalty shoot-out will be used to determine the winner (CAF Champions League Regulations XXVII and CAF Confederation Cup Regulations XXV).

Match

See also 
 2022 CAF Champions League Final
 2022 CAF Confederation Cup Final

Notes

References

External links
CAFonline.com

2022-23
Super Cup
Wydad AC matches
RS Berkane matches
September 2022 sports events in Africa